Hans Lassen Martensen (19 August 1808 – 3 February 1884) was a Danish bishop and academic. He was a professor at the University of Copenhagen and Bishop of the Diocese of Zealand.

Early life 
Martensen was born in a middle-class Lutheran family in Flensburg, in the Duchy of Schleswig (now Germany), as the only son of Hans Andersen Martensen (1782-1822) and Ane Marie Truelsen (1781-1853). At that time Schleswig was a duchy between Holstein and Denmark. He grew up in a German-speaking society, while his father who was a schoolmaster, writer and sea-captain preferred to use Danish. Consequently the young Martensen upbrought in a multicultural situation and reconciliation of different cultures became his one of central interests through his life.

He was  schooled at the Metropolitanskolen and studied theology at the University of Copenhagen  and later was ordained in the Danish Church. From 1834 till 1836 he travelled foreign countries. He visited several cities including Berlin, Munich, Vienna and Paris. He met influential intellects including David Strauss (1808–1874).  During his travel, he began to read mystics; Meister Eckhart, Johannes Tauler and Jakob Böhme. Also he studied Dante's The Divine Comedy with a great interest.

Career
At Copenhagen he was lektor in theology in 1838, professor extra-ordinarius in 1840, court preacher also in 1845, and professor ordinarius in 1850. Once he was offered to a bishopric from the Church of Sweden   but declined. In 1854 however he gave up his educational career and was made bishop of Zealand, the Danish Primate. In his studies he had come under the influence of Friedrich Schleiermacher (1768–1834),  Georg Wilhelm Friedrich Hegel (1770–1831) and Franz Xaver von Baader  (1765–1841); but he was a man of independent mind, and developed a peculiar speculative theology which showed a disposition towards mysticism and theosophy.

Personal life

Martensen was married to Helene Mathilde Hess (19 March 1817 - 20 September 1847), daughter of ship captain and harbour superintendent at Nyhavn District Peter Mathias Hess (1787-1851) and Mette Christine Hansen (c. 1788-1825), on  22 December 1838 in the Garrison Church in Copenhagen. They had one son, Julius Martensen (1839-1910), who would become a literary historian. She died just 30 years old in 1847. 

He married, secondly, to Virginie Henriette Constance Bidoulac (8 April 1817 - 13 May 1904), daughter of language teacher Joseph B. (c. 1765-1839) and Marie Sørensen (1782-1850), on 10 November 1848.

Martensen lived in a now demolished building at Ved Stranden 4 in 1833–1834 and then at Gråbrødretorv 6 in 1835–1838. His next home was in the no longer existing street Hummergade at No. No. 15. He then lived in the Obel House at Vestergade 2 from 1853–1854 before occupying the Bishop's House in Nørregade for the remainder of his life.

Martensen died  on 3 February 1884 in Copenhagen and was buried at Assistens Cemetery.

Legacy
 
His contributions to theological literature included treatises on Christian ethics and dogmatics, on moral philosophy, on baptism, and a sketch of the life of German philosopher  Jakob Böhme (1575–1624)  whose works exercised a marked influence on the mind of English theologian William Law (1686-1761).

Martensen was a distinguished preacher, and his works were translated into various languages. The "official" eulogy he pronounced upon Bishop Jacob Peter Mynster (1775–1854) in 1854, in which he affirmed that the deceased man was one of the authentic truth-witnesses of Christianity to have appeared in the world since apostolic times, brought down upon his head the invectives of Danish philosopher Søren Kierkegaard. Icelandic theologian Magnús Eiríksson (1806–1881), who lived  in Copenhagen from 1831 until his death, was very critical of Martensen’s speculative theology, which he   attacked in various publications from 1844 to 1850.

Theobald Stein created a portrait bust of him in 1876. A bronze copy stands in front of the University of Copenhagen's main building ion Grue Plads in Copenhagen. A marble copy is part of the collection of the Museum of National History at Frederiksborg Castle in Hillerød. David Monies painted a portrait painting of him in 1842. Peder Severin Krøyer painted a portrait painting of him in 1874 and copied it in 1884 (Roskilde Cathedral).

Accolades
 1847: Knight in the Order of the Dannebrog
 1854: Cross of Honour
 1859: Commander in the Order of the Dannebrog
 1869: Grand Cross of Denmark
 1879: Rank of Excellency

Selected works 
 Grundriss des Systems der Moralphilosophie (1841; 3rd ed., 1879; German, 1845)
 
 Die christliche Taufe und die baptistische Frage (2nd ed., 1847; German, 2nd ed., 1860)
 
 
  
 Hirtenspiegel (1870-1872)
 Katholizismus und Protestantismus (1874)
 Jacob Boehme; Studies in his Life and Teaching (1882; Eng. trans., 1885, reprint 1949)]
An autobiography, Aus meinem Leben, appeared in 1883, and after his death the Briefwechsel zwischen Martensen und Dorner.

References

Other sources

Further reading 
 Jon Stewart (ed.), Hans Lassen Martensen - Theologian, Philosopher and Social Critic, Museum Tusculanum Press, 2012. .

External links 
 
 
 Martensen, H., Christian Ethics (transl. by William Affleck) at archive.org

1808 births
1884 deaths
19th-century Danish clergy
People from Flensburg
University of Copenhagen alumni
Academic staff of the University of Copenhagen
Danish Lutheran theologians
19th-century Protestant theologians
Danish Lutheran bishops
19th-century Lutheran bishops
Lutheran socialists
Danish Christian socialists
Burials at Assistens Cemetery (Copenhagen)